Anandi Gopal is a 2019 Indian Marathi Biographical film directed by Sameer Vidhwans and written by Karan Sharma and Irawati Karnik. The film follows the life of Anandi Gopal Joshi. It was jointly produced by Akash Chawla with Shareen Mantri Kedia. Bhagyashree Milind played the role of Anandi Gopal Joshi whereas Lalit Prabhakar played the role of Gopalrao Joshi.

Plot
The story revolves around the Anandi Gopal Joshi and her husband Gopalrao Joshi. She was born raised and married in Kalyan where her family had previously been landlords before experiencing financial losses. Due to pressure from her mother, she was married at the age of nine to Gopalrao Joshi, a widower almost twenty years her senior. After marriage, Gopalrao renamed her 'Anandi'. Gopalrao Joshi worked as a postal clerk in Kalyan. Later, he was transferred to Alibaug and then finally, to Kolhapur. He was a progressive thinker, and supported education for women.

At the age of fourteen, Anandibai gave birth to a boy, but the child lived only for a total of ten days due to lack of medical care. This proved to be a turning point in Anandi's life and inspired her to become a physician. After Gopalrao tried to enroll her in missionary schools and not working out, they moved to Calcutta. There she learned to read and speak Sanskrit and English.

Her husband encouraged her to study medicine. In 1880 he sent a letter to Royal Wilder, a well-known American missionary, stating his wife's interest in studying medicine in the United States and inquiring about a suitable post in the US for himself. Wilder published the correspondence in his Princeton's Missionary Review. Theodicia Carpenter, a resident of Roselle, New Jersey, happened to read it while waiting to see her dentist. Impressed by both Anandibai's desire to study medicine, and Gopalrao's support for his wife, she wrote to Anandibai. Carpenter and Anandibai developed a close friendship and came to refer to each other as "aunt" and "niece." Later, Carpenter would host Anandibai in Rochelle during Joshi's stay in the U.S.Pripas-Kapit, Sarah. Educating Women Physicians of the World: International Students of the Woman's Medical College of Pennsylvania, 1883-1911 (PhD). University of California, Los Angeles.

While the Joshi couple was in Calcutta, Anandibai's health was declining. She suffered from weakness, constant headaches, occasional fever, and sometimes breathlessness. Theodicia sent her medicines from America, without results. In 1883, Gopalrao was transferred to Serampore, and he decided to send Anandibai by herself to America for her medical studies despite her poor health. Though apprehensive, Gopalrao convinced her to set an example for other women by pursuing higher education.

A physician couple named Thorborn suggested that Anandibai apply to the Woman's Medical College of Pennsylvania. On learning of Anandibai's plans to pursue higher education in the West, orthodox Indian society censured her very strongly.

Anandibai addressed the community at Serampore College Hall, explaining her decision to go to America and obtain a medical degree. She discussed the persecution she and her husband had endured. She stressed the need for female doctors in India, emphasizing that Hindu women could better serve as physicians to Hindu women. Her speech received publicity, and financial contributions started pouring in from all over India.

Anandibai travelled to New York from Kolkata (Calcutta) by ship, chaperoned by two female English missionary acquaintances of the Thorborns. In New York, Theodicia Carpenter received her in June 1883. Anandibai wrote to the Woman's Medical College of Pennsylvania, asking to be admitted to their medical program, which was the second women's medical program in the world. Rachel Bodley, the dean of the college, enrolled her.

Anandibai began her medical training at age 19. In America, her health worsened because of the cold weather and unfamiliar diet. She contracted tuberculosis. Nevertheless, she graduated with an MD in March 1886; the topic of her thesis was "Obstetrics among the Aryan Hindoos." The thesis utilized references from both Ayurvedic texts and American medical textbooks. On her graduation, Queen Victoria sent her a congratulatory message.

Cast 

 Bhagyashree Milind as Anandi Gopal Joshi
 Lalit Prabhakar as Gopalrao Joshi
 Kshitee Jog as Anandibai's mother
 Yogesh Soman as Anandibai's father
 Geetanjali Kulkarni as Vimaltai; Gopalrao's mother-in-law
 Sonia Albizuri as Miss Macy
 Jayant Sawarkar as Soman Bhatji
 Ankita Goswami
 Atharva Kulkarni
 Pradeep Patwardhan

Production 
Bhagyashree Milind was selected for the titular role of Anandi Gopal in the film who previously seen in Balak-Palak and Ubuntu. The character of Gopalrao Joshi was played by Lalit Prabhakar.

Soundtrack 

The songs were composed by Hrishikesh-Saurabh-Jasraj while lyrics written by Vaibhav Joshi. The album was released on 22 January 2019. The sound design was done by Bignya Dahal

Reception 
Upon release, the film received positive reviews from critics. Mihir Bhanage from The Times of India gave it 4.0 out of 5 stars, concluding that,  "This one is a must-watch for everyone and when you go to the cinema hall, make sure you stay for the end credits to roll. You won’t regret it".

Ganesh Matkari from Pune Mirror gave it 3.5 out of 5 stars, concluding, "Anandi Gopal could have ended on a sweeter note, avoiding the spoon-feeding bordering on propaganda. But ignore that, and you have a strong film that caters to your heart and mind."

Accolades

References

External links 

 Anandi Gopal at IMDb

2010s Marathi-language films
Filmfare Marathi Awards winners
2019 films